Tamás Rényi (29 May 1929 – 28 July 1980) was a Hungarian film director. He directed 30 films between 1953 and 1980. His 1963 film Tales of a Long Journey was entered into the 3rd Moscow International Film Festival where it won a Silver Prize.

Selected filmography
 Tales of a Long Journey (1963)

References

External links

1929 births
Hungarian film directors
Film people from Budapest

1980 deaths